The Moment of Truth is a 1965 Italian drama film directed by Francesco Rosi. It was entered into the 1965 Cannes Film Festival.

Plot
Miguel leaves the countryside because he doesn't want to become a poor farmer like his father. In the big city he tries everything to make it but accomplishes nothing until he becomes a bullfighter.

Cast
 Miguel Mateo 'Miguelín' as Miguel Romero 'Miguelín'
 José Gómez Sevillano
 Pedro Basauri 'Pedrucho' as himself
 Linda Christian as Linda, American woman
 Curro Carmona
 Luque Gago
 Salvador Mateo
 Gregorio Sánchez

Reception 

On Rotten Tomatoes, the film has an aggregate score of 80% based on 8 positive and 2 negative critic reviews.

References

External links

The Moment of Truth: The Blood of Beasts an essay by Peter Matthews at the Criterion Collection

1965 films
1965 drama films
Italian drama films
1960s Italian-language films
Films directed by Francesco Rosi
Bullfighting films
Films set in Spain
Films with screenplays by Ricardo Muñoz Suay
Films scored by Piero Piccioni
1960s Italian films